Dmitri Vladimirovich Filatov (born 9 February 1977) is a former Russian football player.

External links
 

1977 births
Living people
Russian footballers
FC Lada-Tolyatti players
Russian Premier League players
FC KAMAZ Naberezhnye Chelny players
Association football defenders
FC Orenburg players
FC Neftekhimik Nizhnekamsk players
FC Volga Ulyanovsk players